Villaperuccio (Sa Baronia in Sardinian) is a comune (municipality) in the Province of South Sardinia in the Italian region Sardinia, located about  southwest of Cagliari and about  southeast of Carbonia, in the lower Sulcis.

Villaperuccio borders the municipalities of Narcao, Nuxis, Perdaxius, Piscinas, Santadi, and Tratalias. Its territory includes the pre-Nuragic necropolis of Montessu, some 40 nuraghe and the menhir site of is perdas croccadas.

References

Cities and towns in Sardinia
1979 establishments in Italy
States and territories established in 1979